Clappertonia is a genus of flowering plants belonging to the family Malvaceae.

Its native range is Tropical Africa.

Species:

Clappertonia ficifolia 
Clappertonia minor 
Clappertonia polyandra

References

Malvaceae
Malvaceae genera